The 2020 Georgia State Panthers softball team represented Georgia State Panthers in the 2020 NCAA Division I softball season. The Panthers played their home games at Robert E. Heck Softball Complex. The Panthers were led by tenth year head coach Roger Kincaid and were members of the Sun Belt Conference.

On March 12, the Sun Belt Conference announced the indefinite suspension of all spring athletics, including softball, due to the increasing risk of the COVID-19 pandemic.  On March 16, the Sun Belt formally announced the cancelation of all spring sports, thus ending their season definitely.

Preseason

Sun Belt Conference Coaches Poll
The Sun Belt Conference Coaches Poll was released on January 29, 2020. Georgia State was picked to finish dead-last at tenth in the Sun Belt Conference with 18 votes.

Preseason All-Sun Belt team
Summer Ellyson (LA, SR, Pitcher)
Megan Kleist (LA, SR, Pitcher)
Julie Rawls (LA, SR, Catcher)
Reagan Wright (UTA, SR, Catcher)
Katie Webb (TROY, SR, 1st Base)
Kaitlyn Alderink (LA, SR, 2nd Base)
Hailey Mackay (TXST, SR, 3rd Base)
Alissa Dalton (LA, SR, Shortstop)
Jayden Mount (ULM, SR, Shortstop)
Whitney Walton (UTA, SR, Shortstop)
Tara Oltmann (TXST, JR, Shortstop)
Courtney Dean (CCU, JR, Outfield)
Mekhia Freeman (GASO, SR, Outfield)
Sarah Hudek (LA, SR, Outfield)
Raina O'Neal (LA, JR, Outfield)
Bailey Curry (LA, JR, Designated Player/1st Base)

National Softball Signing Day

Roster

Coaching staff

Schedule and results

Schedule Source:
*Rankings are based on the team's current ranking in the NFCA/USA Softball poll.

References

Georgia State
Georgia State Panthers softball seasons
Georgia State softball